Hauge Church is a parish church of the Church of Norway in Lærdal Municipality in Vestland county, Norway. It is located in the village of Lærdalsøyri. It is the church for the Hauge parish which is part of the Sogn prosti (deanery) in the Diocese of Bjørgvin. The wooden church is painted white with brownish-yellow trim. It was built in a long church design in 1869 using plans drawn up by the architect Christian Christie. The church seats about 500 people.

History
The earliest existing historical records of the church date back to the year 1340, but it was not new that year. The first church was a wooden stave church that was probably built in the 13th century. Hauge Church is named after the Hauge farm where it was located. Around the mid-1600s, the old stave church was torn down and replaced with a new timber-framed long church on the same site. This new building had a nave that measured  and a square choir that measured .

Over time, the church was too small for the parish, so it was decided to build a new church. The new building would be constructed in the quickly growing village of Lærdalsøyri, about  down the valley, closer to the fjord. The name Hauge was kept as the church name even though the church was no longer located at Hauge. The church is the only church in Sogn og Fjordane with two towers. The towers sit on either side of the main entrance to the church and it gives the church an unusually monumental character. The new church building was consecrated on 6 May 1869 by Bishop Peter Hersleb Graah Birkeland.  After the new church was in use, the old church was torn down and its materials were sold to use in building barns.

Media gallery

See also
List of churches in Bjørgvin

References

Lærdal
Churches in Vestland
Long churches in Norway
Wooden churches in Norway
19th-century Church of Norway church buildings
Churches completed in 1869
13th-century establishments in Norway